Mehdishahr (also Romanized as Mehdīshahr; formerly, Sang-e Sar (also Romanized as Sang-i-Sar and Sangsar) is a city and capital of Mehdishahr County, Semnan Province, Iran. At the 2006 census, its population was 20,581, in 5,473 families.

Mehdishahr is located on the southern slopes of the Alborz mountains. Here, the chain of Alborz mountains is very close to the desert of Dasht-e Kavir. 
Sangsar, specially the northern part of it, is completely mountainous with cold winters, heavy snowfalls but with mild summers.

The distance between Sangsar city and Semnan city is 20 kilometers.  The altitude is about 1630 meters above sea level.

The primary religious belief in the area now is Shi‘ite Islam, but before the Islamic Revolution, there were many followers of the Baháʼí Faith in Sangsar, who had to migrate from the city after the revolution, due to a wide range of persecutions. As for other towns of Iran, the name has thus been changed by the Islamic authorities into Mahdishahr as if to signal its imposed pure Muslim identity. Mahdi is the Shia Muslim hidden Imam and Shahr means town in Persian, so Mahdishahr literally means town of Mahdi.

The most important network of roads consists of  Semnan to Sangsar to Shahmirzad to Fooladmahale axis which connects these places with the city of Sari. This road connects the two provinces of Mazandaran and Semnan.

History

Sangsar area has an old history which goes back to 1st millennium BC. First inhabitants of Sangsar used to worship moon and stars. There are some theories about Sangsar name; One of them emphasizes about a Saka origin and suggests the name used to be Sakasar or Saksar which means Saka (scythian) settlement.

Notable residents
 Majid Derakhshani, musician and composer
 Parviz Sabeti, deputy of SAVAK

Sister cities
Sangesar has signed the treaty of city twinning with the following cities:

 Saskatoon, Canada
 Mörön, Mongolia

See also

 Sangsari language

References
Sangsar district, by: Taghi Taheri, Plan & Budget Bureau of Semnan, Semnan March 1977

References

Populated places in Mehdishahr County
Cities in Semnan Province